AIR FM Gold is an FM radio channel in Mumbai, Delhi, Kolkata and Chennai, India. It is run by the All India Radio, a government owned enterprise, a division of Prasar Bharati. In Mumbai, it features Hindi songs, and English songs along with hourly news in English and Hindi. It operates on 100.1 in Mumbai and on 100.1 Megahertz in Delhi. It was started on 15 August 2001 by the then Minister of Information & Broadcasting.

History
Late Indivar Sacdeva, Rajiv Saxena and Naveen K. Gupta were some of the broadcasters who were involved with devising the channel's content and presentation style when it was started in September 2001. At that time this channel was just called FM-2. Later on Danish Iqbal and Vijay Deepak Chhiber were Programme Executives of this channel. FM-1 was the previous channel which is now known as FM Rainbow. Anil Baijal, then CEO of Prasar Bharti wanted to call this as FM Classic but FM-2 name became popular by default. The inaugural show was hosted by Sujata Rath, Senior Announcer.
Programs like Gaate Gungunate, Arpan and Dopaher FM were part of the initial repertoire. Another notable feature of the early days was the daily broadcast of Helpline series where various kinds of counselling was provided involving notable experts of different fields. In those days this channel used to be of 18 hours only, now it is a 24 hours channel.

Channels
All stations are also available online

FM Gold Delhi

AIR FM Gold Delhi is a radio channel broadcast from AIR Delhi. This channel is dedicated to old Bollywood songs. It also broadcasts programs on current affairs from News Service Division of AIR.

FM Gold Mumbai

FM Gold Kolkata

FM Gold Chennai

Programs
FM Rainbow, formerly FM-1, is a metro channel using "Hinglish" which broadcasts a mix of Hindi film music and western pop music. It was initially designed to broadcast only classics of music, drama and literature. Another speciality of that period were the daily phone-in counselling shows involving educational, psychiatric, legal, marriage, home decor, interior decoration, hobbies like music, painting, photography, dance and many more subjects. FM Rainbow became very popular among discerning audience within a short time due to its eclectic programming and old Hindi songs. According to recent surveys its morning, evening and late night shows are more popular than any other channel. It is the only channel which has News and Current Affairs in its programming. In Chennai, it broadcasts Tamil songs and occasional English songs with news in English and Tamil operating in 102.3 MHz. In Delhi it operates in Hindi playing older songs with news/special reports commentary and its frequency is 106.40 MHz. It also airs live commentary for Indian sports.

News Bulletins
The then Information and Broadcasting Minister launched a news and entertainment channel called AIR FM-II (now FM Gold) on 1 September 2001. The channel is on air 24/7. It is a composite blend of information and entertainment with one third of its contents devoted to news and current affairs. Composite news programs in Hindi and English originating from Delhi are exclusively broadcast every morning, midday and evening for a duration of 30 minutes each. These include 'Samachar Prabhat', 'Dopahar Samachar' in Hindi and 'Breakfast News' in English in the morning and 'Samachar Sandhya' in Hindi in the evening and 'News at 9' at 9 p.m. The channel has also some specialized programs like 'Market Mantra' (business magazine) and 'Sports Scan' (sports related programme). Other news-based programs mounted on FM Gold include 'Vaad Samvaad' and 'Countrywide' based on interviews with prominent personalities. It also broadcasts news at every hour.

Hourly news headlines are broadcast on FM Gold in Hindi & English alternately, these are 5 min long. Other than this following programs are broadcast by NSD on FM Gold.

References

External links
FM Gold Delhi TIMING
 FM Gold Mumbai TIMING
Air FM Russia
 FM Gold Delhi Live Stream
 All India Radio - AIR FM Gold Delhi 100.1 - online

Radio stations in Mumbai
Radio stations in Indore
Radio stations in Chennai
Radio stations in Kolkata
Radio stations in Delhi
All India Radio